Lotykove, known officially as Ivanivske since 2016, is an urban-type settlement in Alchevsk Raion of Luhansk Oblast in eastern Ukraine. Population:

History
The settlement was founded in the early 20th century where it was named Ivanovsky Rudnik, then Gustav in 1912 after the entrepreneur.

In 1919, the settlement was renamed to Lotikovo, in memory of the Bolshevik revolutionary Vasiliya Petrovicha Lotikova.

On May 12, 2016, the Verkhovna Rada of Ukraine had de jure renamed the settlement to Ivanivske, but the change is de facto not recognized by the Luhansk People's Republic.

Demographics
Native language distribution as of the Ukrainian Census of 2001:
 Ukrainian: 7.77%
 Russian: 92.06%
 Others 0.03%

Notable people
  (1920–1945), corporal and Hero of the Soviet Union

References

Urban-type settlements in Alchevsk Raion